Break Up, Break Down is the first studio album by the Reigning Sound. It was released on May 15, 2001, by Sympathy for the Record Industry.

The album was the band's second release, following their debut 7" single "Two Sides to Every Man," by three months. Its country-folk melodies stood in stark contrast to some of frontman Greg Cartwright's earlier work with bands such as the Compulsive Gamblers and the Oblivians, and set an early blueprint for the sound the band would explore on their subsequent releases.

Break Up, Break Down featured the first incarnation of the Reigning Sound; Greg Cartwright on lead vocals and guitar; Alex Greene on organ, piano, guitar, and backing vocals; Jeremy Scott on bass and backing vocals; and Greg Roberson on drums.

Track listing 
 "Since When" - 2:23 
 "I Don't Care" - 2:33 
 "You Don't Hear the Music" - 3:11 
 "Goodbye" - 3:51 
 "As Long" - 2:59 
 "Want You" - 2:51 
 "So Goes Love" - 2:34 
 "Take a Ride" - 4:43 
 "Waiting for the Day" - 3:28 
 "So Sad" - 3:24 
 "I'm So Thankful" - 3:01 [ ]

Personnel
 The Reigning Sound - Main Performer
 Greg Cartwright - Guitar, Vocals, Producer
 Jeremy Scott - Bass
 Alex Greene - Organ, Vocals (Background)
 Greg Roberson - Drums
 John Whittemore - Guitar, Steel Guitar (2,5)
 Stuart Sikes - Engineer 
 Tripp Lamkins (Grifters) - cover design

References

2001 debut albums
Reigning Sound albums
Sympathy for the Record Industry albums